Aleksandr Usov may refer to:
 Aleksandr Usov (sprinter) (born 1976), Russian sprinter
 Alexandre Usov (born 1977), Belarusian racing cyclist